Tamsin Jane Ford CBE, FRCPsych, FMedSci (born 17 September 1966) is a British psychiatrist specialising in children's mental health.  Since 2019 she has been based at the University of Cambridge where she is now Professor of Child and Adolescent Psychiatry, Head of the Department of Psychiatry and Fellow of Hughes Hall. She has been heavily involved with the Incredible Years Teacher Classroom Management (TCM) programme, created by Carolyn Webster-Stratton, which aims to raise and improve children's mental health in primary schools across Devon .  Her work also ties in with the Strengths and Difficulties Questionnaire (SDQ), created by UK psychiatrist, Robert Goodman.

Education
Ford received a MB BS  from United Medical Schools of Guy's and St Thomas's, University of London in 1990.  As a junior doctor in 1991-1992, she held posts at Guy's and Lewisham Hospital (surgery), Orpington Hospital (medicine), King's College Hospital (A&E) and Royal London Hospital (eldercare).  She began her core professional training in psychiatry in 1992, passing her MRCPsych examination in 1995.  She was then appointed Senior Registrar in Child and Adolescent Psychiatry with the Bethlem and Maudsley NHS Trust, obtaining a CCST in 1998.

Between 1995-2005 Ford did her fellowship in Child and Adolescent Psychiatry at the Institute of Psychiatry, King's College London while working in the Clinical Research Worker Department at King's, as well as holding clinical posts at Great Ormond Street Hospital (Tourette's Clinic and Epilepsy Surgery Clinic) and Maudsley Hospital (National and Specialist OCD Clinic). Ford received a MSc (distinction) in Epidemiology at the London School of Hygiene and Tropical Medicine in 2000, followed by a PhD in 2004 with the thesis "Services for Children with mental health disorders: rates and predictors of specialist service use".

Towards the end of her fellowship, Ford worked briefly for the Croydon Child and Adolescent Mental Health Service as a member of their Children Looked After Team.  She was also one of the editors of the book A Practical Psychiatric Epidemiology  published in 2003 and highly commended in the BMA book competition held the following year.  In 2005 she was appointed MRC Clinician Scientist for the Department of Child and Adolescent Psychiatry at the Institute of Psychiatry, King's College London.

Career

In 2005 Ford was appointed MRC Clinician Scientist for the Department of Child and Adolescent Psychiatry at the Institute of Psychiatry, King's College London.

In 2007 she moved to Exeter, Devon, where she was appointed Clinical Senior Lecturer at the Peninsula Medical School, University of Exeter, setting up the Child Mental Health Research Group in September.  At the beginning of 2008 she was appointed to the Exeter and Mid Devon Child and Adolescent Mental Health Service (Devon Partnership NHS Trust) as an honorary consultant.  Later that year, her publication "Five years on: public sector service use related to mental health in young people with ADHD or hyperkinetic disorder five years after diagnosis", of which she was a co-author, was selected as one of the top ten publications of the year by editors of the Child and Adolescent Mental Health journal.

Another honorary consultant role followed in May 2011, when Ford was appointed to the Exeter Liaison team on the Devon NHS Partnership Trust.  Two years later she was appointed as personal chair of Child and Adolescent Psychiatry at the University of Exeter Medical School, in 2014 she was awarded a FRCPsych - becoming a fellow of the Royal College of Psychiatrists, and became a Fellow of the Academy of Medical Sciences in 2020. In 2012 Ford started setting up of the Incredible Years Teacher Classroom Management (TCM) programme to promote awareness and understanding of mental health in children aged 6–11; by 2018 this programme was implemented in 80 Devon primary schools.  In 2018 Ford was voted as one of the 100 most influential women in Exeter by Grow Exeter.

In the summer of 2019, Ford was awarded a CBE for her work in transforming mental health services and schools in the United Kingdom, with her work regularly cited in government, NHS and education policy.

She moved to the University of Cambridge Department of Psychiatry in 2019.

Honours

Fellow of the Academy of Medical Sciences 
CBE
Fellow of the Royal College of Psychiatrists
Chair of the Child and Adolescent Psychiatry Surveillance Service
Founder member of the Child Outcome Research Consortium (CORC)

Selected publications

Notes

References

External links
The Incredible Years

1966 births
Living people
Alumni of King's College London
Fellows of the Academy of Medical Sciences (United Kingdom)
British psychiatrists
British child psychiatrists
British women psychiatrists
Commanders of the Order of the British Empire